The Planar T* 85 mm 1.4 ZA (SAL-85F14Z) is a high-quality wide-aperture prime telephoto lens compatible with cameras using the Sony α lens mount, (Minolta A-mount). It was designed and is manufactured by Sony in Japan in collaboration with Carl Zeiss. It is compatible with Minolta A-mount film and Konica-Minolta A-mount digital cameras as well as Sony α digital SLR cameras.

See also
 Zeiss Planar

Sources
Dyxum lens data

85
85
Camera lenses introduced in 2007